Vebjørn Tandberg (16 September 1904 – 30 August 1978) was a Norwegian electronics engineer.

Tandberg was born at Bodø in Nordland, Norway. He attended the Norwegian Institute of Technology  in Trondheim (1930).

He founded Tandbergs Radiofabrikk of Oslo in 1933 and made it a great success.
In addition to his technical and commercial achievements, Tandberg was a pioneer in providing good conditions for his workforce. He instituted a 42-hour week and three weeks' annual vacation for all in 1937, and a free pension and health insurance scheme for all from 1938. A four-week vacation for all employees over 40 years of age was introduced in 1947, while the working week was reduced to 39 hours in 1948. There was a five-day work week during the summer months from 1955, over the full year from 1969.

His life ended under tragic circumstances—suicide—after financial problems at the radio factory and the ensuing political maneuverings had left him without control so that he was frozen out from his life's work. Subsequently, Tandbergs Radiofabrikk declared bankruptcy and underwent corporation reorganization .

References

Other sources
 Dahl, Helmer; Strømme Svendsen, Arnljot (1995). Vebjørn Tandberg - triumf og tragedie. Fagbokforlaget. 263 pp. .
 History of Tandbergs Radiofabrikk 1933–78

1904 births
1978 suicides
Norwegian electronics engineers
Norwegian company founders
Norwegian Institute of Technology alumni
Suicides in Norway
Tandberg
People from Bodø
1978 deaths